Afrosepsis is a genus of flies in the family Sepsidae.

Species
A. camerounica Ozerov, 1996
A. elongata Ozerov, 1999
A. lineata Ozerov, 1999
A. quadrimaculata Ozerov, 1999
A. sublateralis (Vanschuytbroeck, 1962)

References

Sepsidae
Diptera of Africa
Brachycera genera